In several mathematical areas, including harmonic analysis, topology, and number theory, locally compact abelian groups are abelian groups which have a particularly convenient topology on them. For example, the group of integers (equipped with the discrete topology), or the real numbers or the circle (both with their usual topology) are locally compact abelian groups.

Definition and examples

A topological group is called locally compact if the underlying topological space is locally compact and Hausdorff; the topological group is called abelian if the underlying group is abelian.

Examples of locally compact abelian groups include:

  for n a positive integer,  with vector addition as group operation.
  The positive real numbers  with multiplication as operation.
 Any finite abelian group, with the discrete topology.  By the structure theorem for finite abelian groups, all such groups are products of cyclic groups.
 The integers  under addition, again with the discrete topology.
 The circle group, denoted  for torus. This is the group of complex numbers of modulus 1.  is isomorphic as a topological group to the quotient group .
 The field  of p-adic numbers under addition, with the usual p-adic topology.

The dual group

This topology is in general not metrizable. However, if the group  is a separable locally compact abelian group, then the dual group is metrizable.

A group that is isomorphic (as topological groups) to its dual group is called self-dual. While the reals and finite cyclic groups are self-dual, the group and the dual group are not naturally isomorphic, and should be thought of as two different groups.

Examples of dual groups

A character on the infinite cyclic group of integers  under addition is determined by its value at the generator 1. The topology of uniform convergence on compact sets is in this case the topology of pointwise convergence. This is the topology of the circle group inherited from the complex numbers.

Since  is compact, the topology on the dual group is that of uniform convergence, which turns out to be the discrete topology.

Analogously, the group of -adic numbers  is isomorphic to its dual. It follows that the adeles are self-dual.

Pontryagin duality

Pontryagin duality asserts that the functor

induces an equivalence of categories between the opposite of the category of locally compact abelian groups (with continuous morphisms) and itself:

Categorical properties
 shows that the category LCA of locally compact abelian groups measures, very roughly speaking, the difference between the integers and the reals. More precisely, the algebraic K-theory spectrum of the category of locally compact abelian groups and the ones of Z and R lie in a homotopy fiber sequence

References

Abelian group theory
Topological groups